The MUD trees below depict hierarchies of derivation among MUD codebases. Solid lines between boxes indicate code relationships, while dotted lines indicate conceptual relationships. Dotted boxes indicate that the codebase is outside the family depicted.

Note that codebases are different from individual servers, in the same way that a biological family/genus/species is different from a specific bird at a zoo or fossil imprint in a museum.  Some of the codebases below are incredibly popular, with many servers based on them; other codebases may only be found on archive sites, making them available but effectively extinct.  For a list of specific servers using some of these codebases, see the Chronology of MUDs article.

AberMUD family tree

TinyMUD family tree
Also known as MU*

LPMud family tree

DikuMUD family tree

See also
 MUD
 List of MUDs
 AberMUD
 TinyMUD
 LPMud
 DikuMUD

References

External links
The Dikumud Family Tree from the official DikuMUD site.
A Classification of MUDs by Martin Keegan
Another version of the mud family tree.
MUD Genealogy Project is a very complete version of mud family tree.
The History of Pike

MUDs